NLR may refer to:

 National Library of Russia, Saint Petersburg
 National LambdaRail, a high-speed computer network
 Nazi Lowriders, a white prison and criminal organization
 New Left Review, a political academic journal
 Neutrophil to lymphocyte ratio, a marker of subclinical inflammation
 Newark Light Rail, New Jersey, U.S.
 Newcastle Light Rail, Newcastle, New South Wales, Australia
 Nucleotide-binding leucine-rich repeat receptor/NOD-like receptor, a family of intracellular immunoreceptors
 North London Railway
 North Little Rock, Arkansas
 Northampton and Lamport Railway, England
 Royal Netherlands Aerospace Centre